Shahid Espandi Cup was an exhibition football tournament in Iran that was played in 1979 in a format of 5 Groups for the group stage followed by a second round and then semi-finals and final. The tournament was won by Persepolis F.C.

Group Stage Round 1

Group 1
Standings
1. Tehran Javan
2. Persepolis

Group 2

Group 3

Group 4

Group 5

Group Stage Round 2

Group 1

Standings
1. Pas F.C.
2. Sarbaz

Group 2

Standings
1. Persepolis
2. Shahin

Persepolis F.C. 0 Shahin 0

Semi finals

3rd/4th-place match

Final

References

Az Shahin Ta Piroozi, Kayhan Publication, 1995, 30 years Special Edition.

Football cup competitions in Iran
1979–80 in Iranian football
Iran